Bezrukov (masculine) or Bezrukova (feminine) is a common Russian surname, derived from the word "безрукий" (literally mean "armless").

People with this surname include:
 Anastasia Bezrukova (born 2004), Russian model and actress
Donald Heathfield (real name: Andrey Bezrukov, born 1960), Soviet spy
 Lyudmila Bezrukova (born 1945), Soviet sprint canoer
 Sergey Bezrukov (biophysicist), Russian biophysicist
 Sergey Bezrukov (born 1973), Russian actor and son of Vitali Bezrukov
 Vitali Bezrukov (born 1942), Russian actor and theatre director

Russian-language surnames